The double-collared seedeater (Sporophila caerulescens) is a species of bird in the family Thraupidae.

It is found in Argentina, Bolivia, Brazil, Paraguay, Peru, and Uruguay, as well as the southern border of Colombia on the Amazon River.
Its natural habitats are subtropical or tropical moist shrubland, pastureland, and heavily degraded former forest.

Description

It is a dimorphic species, with the male having a gray head and back, a black-collared throat, paired with a black band just below, across the upper whitish breast. It has gray legs, a medium length tail, and the stout bill for seed-eating. The female is less colorful.

Distribution
The species ranges from central Argentina east of the Andes cordillera northwards through Bolivia and Paraguay, and northeastwards into south-central Brazil, and southeast coastal Brazil; the species retreats into Amazonia during the austral winter. The double-collared seedeater is only found in the southern Amazon Basin, limited by the Amazon River as its northern limit.

In the west Amazon Basin it is found in eastern regions of Peru, the Ucayali River areas, and mostly the eastern bank of the north-flowing river. In the southeast Basin, it ranges from the Cerrado into the upstream two-thirds of the north-flowing Araguaia-Tocantins River drainage system.

References

External links
Double-collared Seedeater videos on the Internet Bird Collection
Stamps (for Argentina) with RangeMap
Double-collared Seedeater photo gallery VIREO 
Photo-High Res; Article oiseaux

Sporophila
Birds of the Cerrado
Birds of the Pantanal
Birds of the Amazon Basin
Birds of Argentina
Birds of Paraguay
Birds of Uruguay
Birds of Bolivia
Birds of Peru
Birds of Brazil
Birds described in 1823
Taxa named by Louis Jean Pierre Vieillot
Taxonomy articles created by Polbot